Karla Nelsen (born December 9, 1965) is a former amateur female bodybuilder (fbb) from the United States.

Nelsen grew up in Pine City, Minnesota. That is where she became involved in the fledgling sport of women's bodybuilding. She won the AAU Ms. America title in 1993 and the NABBA Ms. USA title in 1994.

But she also did work for Bill Wick, Premier Productions, Builtmore Productions, Flexible Productions, Leather & Lace, AnnDees Amazons (former Montenegro Videos ) and Mass Muscle where the men were not that small. She also wrestled women (competitive, semi-competitive, and submission style) where she was undefeated until her confrontation against Nicole Bass, renowned to be "the world's largest fbb" ( and ), who was the only one to dominate her in a competitive match produced by Mass Muscle.

Karla is married to Al Blake.  Al Blake is a retired American professional wrestler known as Vladimir Petrov.

Contest history
1990 NPC Junior USA - 5th (HW)
1992 NPC USA Championship - 10th (HW)
1993 AAU Ms America - 1st (Tall & Overall)
1994 NABBA Ms. USA Nationals - 1st
1994 NABBA Ms. Universe - 4th (Tall)

References

Brainy Media
Muscle Memory (contest results)

1965 births
Living people
American female bodybuilders
People from Pine City, Minnesota
21st-century American women